Rolleston  is the seat and largest town in the Selwyn District, in the Canterbury region of New Zealand's South Island. The town has a population of  making it New Zealand's 24th-largest urban area and the third-largest in Canterbury (behind Christchurch and Timaru). It was nicknamed the "Town of the Future" in the 1970s by Prime Minister Norman Kirk. The "Town of the Future" signage has since been removed from the entrances to Rolleston.

History
Rolleston originated as a railway terminus in 1866, and is named after the Canterbury statesman William Rolleston. Rolleston, who was born in Yorkshire in 1831 and died in 1903, served as Superintendent of the Province of Canterbury from 1868 until 1876 (when central government abolished the New Zealand provinces). He also served as a Member of Parliament, holding various Cabinet portfolios.  In the 1970s, Prime Minister Norman Kirk had a dream of turning the town of less than 1,000 people into a city of 80,000.

Selwyn District Council proposed an industrial subdivision, Izone, in 2000. The council purchased rural land adjacent to the Main South Line opposite the town the following year. The Warehouse Group developed its South Island distribution centre at the Izone.

The Selwyn District Council built the Toka Hāpai Selwyn Health Hub in 2021. The Health Hub was completed in May 2021, and has a Canterbury District Health Board Primary Birthing Unit as well Pacific Radiology, a physiotherapist and may have a general practice service. It was estimated to cost $14.7 million.

In late 2020, the Selwyn District Council were considering applications (private plan changes) to rezone land around Rolleston to accommodate a further 4500 houses. The Christchurch City Council was opposing this until concerns about the “significant adverse effects of downstream traffic within Christchurch” could be addressed.

In 2021, a $85 million shopping centre called Rolleston Fields was planned to be built on the old Rolleston domain on Tennyson Street. It is expected to form part of a new town centre that has been master planned by the Selwyn District Council. It is expected to include cinemas and a covered farmers market. It is planned to be built in four stages. The Selwyn District Council are planning to also build a pedestrian square to provide an "identifiable heart" of the town.

Christchurch earthquakes 
Rolleston was close to the epicentre of the 2010 Canterbury earthquake being near the end of the Greendale Fault, experiencing movement two times the strength of that in Christchurch City. Residents were without power following the quake, some for more than 48 hours, and were required to boil water for weeks before services were restored. Rolleston was close to many of the aftershocks following the September quake.

Rolleston suffered low damage due to the ground having underlying stones and stable rock. For such reasons, Rolleston has not been affected by liquefaction to date, and only a few houses have been condemned and demolished from earthquake damage.

The 2011 Christchurch earthquake caused a minor amount of extra damage, mostly to buildings which had already been previously affected.

The population of Rolleston has expanded rapidly since the Christchurch earthquakes due to the land stability and fast tracking of building consents by the Selwyn District Council.

Amenities 
Rolleston is home to Pineglades Naturist Club, the South Island's largest naturist resort.

The Selwyn Aquatic Centre has five pools including a 25-meter pool with ten lanes.

Foster Park, Brookside Park and Rolleston Reserve provide sports grounds for many sports including cricket, softball, baseball, hockey, football, rugby, rugby league, athletics, tennis and netball. Foster Park also includes an off-leash dog exercise area.

The Rolleston public library, Te Ara Ātea, opened in December 2021. The $22.2 million building was designed by architects Warren and Mahoney. The two storied 2200 square metre building is expected to be the centrepiece of Rolleston's town centre. Prior to its opening the library shared premises with the Rolleston Community Centre.

The Selwyn Sports Centre, the largest sports centre in Canterbury, opened on 2 May 2021. It has eight indoor courts and an indoor walking track.

Rolleston is set to build the South Island's biggest retail complex called The Station. Construction is set to begin in 2023.

Climate 
The radiata pine plantations that were once a feature of this part of Canterbury have largely been replaced by more water-intensive grazing land to take advantage of the "dairy boom" of the early 21st century.  Shelter belts of radiata, another significant earlier feature of the Plains (and very effective at mitigating the desiccating effects of the nor'west wind), have also been removed as they formed a barrier to the huge central-pivot irrigators that are now commonplace in the area.  Rolleston is very exposed on the Canterbury Plains and is therefore slightly drier, with a more continental climate, than nearby Christchurch. There are many vineyards in the area.

The warmest month of the year is January with an average high temperature of 23 °C. The coldest month of the year occurs in July, when the average high temperature is 10 °C. Monthly rainfall ranges between an average of 33mm in January to 56mm in July.

Demographics

Until 1990 the town had only a few sealed streets and a population of just under 1,000. The current expansion began in the 1990s.

Rolleston had a population of 17,532 at the 2018 New Zealand census, an increase of 7,926 people (82.5%) since the 2013 census, and an increase of 12,510 people (249.1%) since the 2006 census. There were 5,622 households. There were 8,679 males and 8,850 females, giving a sex ratio of 0.98 males per female, with 4,539 people (25.9%) aged under 15 years, 3,201 (18.3%) aged 15 to 29, 8,538 (48.7%) aged 30 to 64, and 1,257 (7.2%) aged 65 or older.

Ethnicities were 86.1% European/Pākehā, 9.4% Māori, 2.5% Pacific peoples, 8.9% Asian, and 2.7% other ethnicities (totals add to more than 100% since people could identify with multiple ethnicities).

The proportion of people born overseas was 23.0%, compared with 27.1% nationally.

Although some people objected to giving their religion, 58.1% had no religion, 32.2% were Christian, 1.0% were Hindu, 0.5% were Muslim, 0.6% were Buddhist and 2.2% had other religions.

Of those at least 15 years old, 2,721 (20.9%) people had a bachelor or higher degree, and 1,821 (14.0%) people had no formal qualifications. The employment status of those at least 15 was that 8,346 (64.2%) people were employed full-time, 1,824 (14.0%) were part-time, and 315 (2.4%) were unemployed.

Education 
Rolleston has five full primary (year 1–8) schools:
Clearview Primary School is a state school with a roll of approximately  students. The school opened in February 2010.
Lemonwood Grove School is a state school  with a roll of approximately  students. The school opened in February 2017.
Rolleston School is a state school with a roll of approximately  students. The school opened in 1893.
Rolleston Christian School is a state-integrated nondenominational Christian school with a roll of approximately  students. The school opened in February 2015.
West Rolleston Primary School is a state school with a roll of approximately  students. The school opened in February 2016.
Te Rōhutu Whio School which opened in early 2022. It is one of the first schools in Rolleston to  use Te Reo Māori as a core part of their curriculum.

Waitaha School is a special needs school with a roll of  students.

Rolleston College is the sole secondary school in Rolleston, with a roll of approximately  students. It opened on 30 January 2017, initially taking only Year 9 students and adding year levels as the 2017 Year 9 cohort moved through; the school opened to all year levels (Years 9 to 13) in January 2021. Prior to Rolleston College's opening, the nearest secondary school to Rolleston was Lincoln High School in Lincoln.

All these schools are coeducational. Rolls are as of

Transport

Bus 
Three local bus routes serve Rolleston, both being part of Environment Canterbury's Metro system: route 5 connects Rolleston with central Christchurch, Linwood, and New Brighton via Templeton, Hornby and Riccarton, route 820 (Burnham to Lincoln) connects Rolleston to the nearby towns of Burnham and Lincoln, and route 85 (Rolleston to Ara Institute) an express route connecting Rolleston with Central Christchurch and Ara Institute via Christchurch Hospital.

Rail 
Rolleston is the site of the railway junction between the Midland line to Greymouth and the Main South Line. The town served as a major railway junction point from the 1880s until the late 1980s, when the New Zealand government deregulated the railways, and Rolleston became a stop only for the tourist-oriented TranzAlpine rail service. In 1993 Rolleston saw one of the country's worst level-crossing accidents, when a cement mixer truck collided with a passenger train at the now-closed George Holmes Road level crossing and killed three train passengers.

The Labour Party promised to invest $100 million in Christchurch's public transport, including commuter rail between Rolleston and the city if it won the 2017 election. Andrew Little said the Rolleston to Christchurch commuter railway line would be a permanent service and the Labour Party wanted to see it up and running "within a few years". A commuter railway line would require significant central government money and land acquisitions to be achievable.  The New Zealand Transport Agency expects the business case should be ready in 2021.

Road 
State Highway 1 passes through Rolleston on its route between Christchurch and Timaru. In September 2020, the extension of the Christchurch Southern Motorway was completed, connecting Rolleston and Addington at Brougham Street. This has significantly improved commuting times to Christchurch.

A two-lane overbridge has been proposed to connect residential areas of Rolleston to the industrial zone (Izone), crossing SH 1 from Rolleston Drive to Hoskyns Road. Construction is expected to commence in 2024 and be completed in late 2027. The project is expected to cost of $125 million.

Government 
Rolleston is part of the Selwyn electorate. The Selwyn District Council is responsible for providing local government services to Rolleston. The Selwyn District Council is based in Rolleston at 2 Norman Kirk Drive.

Prison 
Rolleston Prison is located just west of the town, housing up to 260 minimum to medium security male prisoners.

Military
Burnham Military Camp is located about 3 kilometres west from the town centre. Burnham was a major staging post for the NZDF and overseas military forces during the Christchurch Earthquakes.

References

Selwyn District
Populated places in Canterbury, New Zealand